Scaër is a commune in the Finistère department of Brittany in north-western France.

Population
Inhabitants of Scaër are called in French Scaërois. Scaër's population peaked at 7,838 in 1946 and declined to 5,295 in 2019. This represents a 32.4% decrease in total population since the peak census figure.

Geography

Scaër, encompassing 11,758 hectares, is the most spread-out city in Finistère and the third in Brittany. Historically, Scaër belongs to Cornouaille.

Neighbouring communes

Scaër is border by Guiscriff to the east, by Leuhan and Roudouallec to the north, by Tourc'h to the west and by Rosporden and Bannalec to the south.

Breton language
The municipality launched a linguistic plan concerning the Breton language through Ya d'ar brezhoneg on 20 March 2007.

In 2008, 11.62% of primary-school children attended bilingual schools.

See also
The Cavalcade of Scaër
Communes of the Finistère department

References

External links

Official website 

Mayors of Finistère Association 

Communes of Finistère